SCAMPER is an acronym that provides a structured way of assisting students to think out of the box and enhance their knowledge.

It is thought to protect students' creativity as they mature.

History 

SCAMPER was proposed by Alex Faickney Osborn in 1953, and was further developed by Bob Eberle in 1971 in his book — "SCAMPER:  Games for Imagination Development."

Definition 

SCAMPER is an activity-based thinking process that can be performed by Cooperative learning. Here the teacher assists the students in choosing a particular topic and helps them to develop it through a structured process. After picking an idea, the students are given a tale where they perform the activity in steps corresponding to the letters in the name.

 Substitute comes up with another topic that is equivalent to the present topics. 
 Combine adds information to the original topic. 
 Adjust identifies ways to construct the topic in a more flexible and adjusted material. 
 Modify, magnify, minify creatively changes the topic or makes a feature/idea bigger or smaller. 
 Put to other uses identifies the possible scenarios and situations where this topic can be used. 
 Eliminate removes ideas or elements from the topic that are not valuable. 
 Reverse, rearrange evolves a new concept from the original concept.

Hence, SCAMPER as a teaching strategy helps the students to analyze the knowledge in its creative form and helps the teacher to make teaching creative and interesting.

References

Acronyms
Creativity
Problem solving